Johan Cruyff Stadium (Catalan: Estadi Johan Cruyff; Spanish: Estadio Johan Cruyff) is a football stadium operated by FC Barcelona in Sant Joan Despí, Province of Barcelona, Catalonia, Spain, located in the Ciutat Esportiva Joan Gamper, the club's training facility and youth academy, about 7 km from Camp Nou. The stadium is home to FC Barcelona Atlètic, women's team, and Juvenil A (U19 A team). It is named in honor of legendary Dutch footballer Johan Cruyff who died in March 2016.

It is a UEFA Category 3 stadium and houses 6,000 supporters. As part of the Espai Barça project, it is the replacement for the Mini Estadi, which was in front of Camp Nou and was demolished in 2020, and the land of the Mini Estadi will be used to build the Nou Palau Blaugrana.

History 

Estadi Johan Cruyff broke ground on 14 September 2017 and was completed in Summer 2019. It was opened on 27 August 2019 with a friendly match between the under-19 teams of Barcelona and Ajax. The match ended up in a 0–2 score where Ajax was the winner. On 26 August 2019, a day before the stadium was officially opened to the public, FC Barcelona paid tribute to Cruyff by unveiling his statue at Camp Nou.

References 

Football venues in Barcelona
FC Barcelona Atlètic
FC Barcelona
Johan Cruyff
Sports venues completed in 2019